Chandler Michael Smith Sr. (born June 26, 2002) is an American professional stock car racing driver. He competes full-time in the NASCAR Xfinity Series, driving the No. 16 Chevrolet Camaro for Kaulig Racing and part-time in the NASCAR Cup Series, driving the No. 13 Chevrolet Camaro ZL1 for Kaulig Racing. He was a member of Toyota Racing Development's TD2 program from 2018 until the end of the 2022 season.

Racing career

In 2013, Smith won the bandoleros national championship after two wins at Atlanta, one at Charlotte and one at Bethel Motor Speedway. In 2018, Smith made his ARCA Menards Series debut at the Nashville Fairgrounds Speedway and won the pole after qualifying was rained out. He led 51 laps and finished 5th in the race. In his fourth ARCA start, Smith dominated at Madison International Speedway and won his first race after leading the most laps.

On September 15, 2018, Smith dominated at Salem Speedway, leading nearly every lap to win his second race.

On November 2, 2018, it was announced that Smith would return to Venturini Motorsports for the 2019 season for 11 races. Smith will run mostly short track events due to age restrictions.

On February 21, 2019, Kyle Busch Motorsports announced that Smith would run a four-race NASCAR Gander Outdoors Truck Series schedule in the team's Nos. 46 and 51 Toyota Tundras. In just his first truck series start at Iowa, he would capture the pole after qualifying would be rained out with the starting order based on owner's points. Smith would lead the initial 55 laps and finished 8th in the race.

Smith would return to Venturini part-time in the No. 20 for the third year in a row in 2020, with him in the car for 13 races while Ryan Repko would join the team that year to drive it in most of the races at the larger tracks such as Daytona where Smith was not able to compete at due to being under 18. Ten of Smith's races that year were part of the brand new Sioux Chief Showdown, which put him in contention to win that separate championship within the ARCA Series.

On March 3, 2020, Smith was announced to return to KBM part-time in the Truck Series for the 2020 season. His original schedule included eight races, all in the No. 51, which were at Richmond, Dover, Michigan, Gateway, Bristol, Las Vegas, Talladega, and the season finale at Phoenix. His schedule was shuffled due to the COVID-19 pandemic; at Texas in November, Smith spun and criticized Tanner Gray for the lack of an ability to drive straight; Smith was later blamed by Ben Rhodes for a last-lap incident, although Smith never publicly accepted blame.

Smith was promoted to a full-time Truck Series schedule for 2021, driving the No. 18 for KBM. He almost won the series' inaugural race at Knoxville, but lost the lead to Austin Hill in the closing laps and green-white-checkered attempts. Smith did barely qualify for the playoffs in the 10th and final spot despite being disqualified in the regular-season finale at Watkins Glen. At Bristol, in a must-win situation to make the Round of 8 in the playoffs, Smith won, beating Grant Enfinger and teammate John Hunter Nemechek as Nemechek overshot turn 1 and race leader Sheldon Creed was put into the wall by Smith and overshot turn 1 and spun finishing 19th. A 35th place finish at Las Vegas and a 19th place finish at Talladega cost Smith a chance at the Championship 4. Despite this, he won at Phoenix and finished eighth in the standings.

Smith began the 2022 season with a 21st place finish at Daytona. He scored wins at Las Vegas and Pocono to make the playoffs. During the playoffs, he won at Richmond and stayed consistent enough to make the Championship 4. Smith finished third at Phoenix and third in the standings.

On October 5, 2022, Kaulig Racing announced that Smith would replace A. J. Allmendinger in the No. 16 in 2023 in the Xfinity Series, as Allmendinger would return to a full-time schedule in the Cup Series.

On January 18, 2023, Kaulig Racing announced that Smith will attempt to make his Cup Series debut in the 2023 Daytona 500, with an additional four race schedule, driving a third car for the team. Smith failed to make the Daytona 500 after finishing 18th in Duel 1 of the 2023 Bluegreen Vacations Duels.

Personal life
Smith attended Pickens High School in Jasper, Georgia and was a part of the graduating class of 2020.

Smith proposed to his girlfriend Kenzie Grams on New Year's Day in 2021; they were married on July 17, 2021. On February 4, 2022, they announced they were expecting a child. Their son Chandler Smith Jr. was born on August 4, 2022.

Motorsports career results

NASCAR
(key) (Bold – Pole position awarded by qualifying time. Italics – Pole position earned by points standings or practice time. * – Most laps led.)

Cup Series

Daytona 500

Xfinity Series

Camping World Truck Series

 Season still in progress
 Ineligible for series points

Pinty's Series

ARCA Menards Series
(key) (Bold – Pole position awarded by qualifying time. Italics – Pole position earned by points standings or practice time. * – Most laps led.)

ARCA Menards Series East

References

External links

 
 

Living people
NASCAR drivers
ARCA Menards Series drivers
2002 births
Racing drivers from Georgia (U.S. state)
CARS Tour drivers
Kyle Busch Motorsports drivers